Bearfoot was a post-bluegrass band that was formed in Alaska in 1999 as Bearfoot Bluegrass. The original all-Alaskan band competed in and won the 26th annual Telluride Bluegrass band contest in 2001, and returned the following year to perform in the Telluride Bluegrass Festival. They later changed their name to Bearfoot as their music evolved to include americana, post-bluegrass, and string instrument based pop.

They have written many songs, including (also, the writing of) the Alaskan epic Fishtrap Joe, based on one of the historical struggles in Alaska (between locals and Seattle fish empires over fish traps) and the finding of an old skeleton near Cordova by two boys, one of which (Mike Mickelson) later became a founding Bearfoot Bluegrass band member.

History

Bearfoot Bluegrass
Before there was Bearfoot Bluegrass, most of the starting line-up met at the Alaska Folk Arts Camp in Anchorage, Alaska. Angela Oudean (vocals, fiddle), Jason Norris (vocals, mandolin), Kate Hamre (acoustic bass), and Annalisa Woodlee (vocals, fiddle) were from Anchorage, and Mike Mickleson (rhythm and lead guitar) was from Cordova, Alaska. Mike's mother, Belle Mickelson, decided to start a music camp in Cordova to encourage her son to practice and play. The others joined Mike there, and when Belle decided to create a camp band, the 4H Fiddle and Dance Camp, also known as the Bluegrass and Old-Time Music and Dance Camp, these five players plus Malani O'Toole (vocals, fiddle, guitar) came together as Bearfoot Bluegrass in 1999. The band started traveling around the state teaching and encouraging music in small rural communities. In February 2001 they recorded their first album Only Time Knows, and then made history in June by becoming the first Alaskan band to win the Telluride Bluegrass band contest, joining the ranks of such reputable artists as Nickel Creek and The Dixie Chicks.

For their second album, Back Home, they approached Todd Phillips in 2003 and asked him to produce it. Todd helped teach the band more advanced techniques, timing, rhythm, and he worked on the singing and phrasing, concentrating on details. He helped turn the band from talented beginners into skilled musicians.

Bearfoot
As the music of the band evolved to include music beyond bluegrass, they changed their name from "Bearfoot Bluegrass" to simply "Bearfoot", intending to reflect the americana approach of their music, and their becoming post-bluegrass. Under this heading, they released the album Follow Me in 2006. The Alaskans were joined by Californian Odessa Jorgensen (fiddle, vocals) at the end of 2008, after Annalisa Tornfelt left the band to spend more time with her family. The band continued to be widely beloved for its three strong female vocalists. In 2009, Bearfoot signed with Compass Records, and produced the highly acclaimed album Doors and Windows. Bearfoot, staying true to its roots, in 2009 toured Alaska twice with impressive turn-out—in June and again in November. The second time through, to the delight of many, they toured in break-up boots in classic Alaskan style, all except for Jorgensen, who at their performance in Talkeetna voiced her disappointment at not having been informed of this unorthodox dress code. In general, Bearfoot has enjoyed a devoted following among Alaskans who view them as "small town heroes".

Resignations and Departure
In 2010 Kate Hamre left the band, with fellow band member Mike Mickelson saying that she felt that "ten years was enough". She was replaced by Sam Grisman, the son of 1960's icon David Grisman. In early 2011, Mike Mickelson, the only member of the band still living in Alaska, departed to go back to "fishing... in Cordova". Grisman and Odessa Jorgensen also departed at approximately the same time.

A very much reconstructed band then moved base to Nashville, Tennessee, and with new members Nora Jane Struthers, P. J. George, and Todd Grebe, produced the album American Story in 2011.

Nora Jane Struthers quit in 2012 and the band called it quits with a final show in Bozeman, MT, in February 2013.

Discography

Albums
Only Time Knows (2001) Bearfoot Bluegrass
Back Home (2003) Glacier Records
Follow Me (2006) Glacier Records
Doors and Windows (2009) Compass Records
American Story (2011) Compass Records

Music videos

References

External links
 

1999 establishments in Alaska
American bluegrass music groups
Musical groups from Alaska
People from Cordova, Alaska